Raunaq Kapur (born 6 February 2004) is a Hong Kong cricketer. In November 2019, he was named in Hong Kong's squad for the 2019 ACC Emerging Teams Asia Cup in Bangladesh. He made his List A debut for Hong Kong, against Bangladesh, in the Emerging Teams Cup on 14 November 2019. Later the same month, he was named in Hong Kong's squad for the Cricket World Cup Challenge League B tournament in Oman.

Prior to his debut for the Hong Kong Cricket Team, he also played for the Hong Kong Under-19 National cricket-team at the Asian Cricket Council's Eastern Region tournament in July 2019, in which he won the award for Best Bowler of the tournament. Kapur took 11 wickets with a bowling average of 6.36, including one five-wicket haul. He had also previously played for the Hong Kong Under-19 National cricket-team at the 2018 ACC Under-19 Asia Cup.

References

External links
 

2004 births
Living people
Hong Kong cricketers
Place of birth missing (living people)